Luques Curtis (born August 17, 1983) is an American bassist from Hartford, Connecticut. Now based in New York City, Luques has been performing nationally and internationally with artists such as Eddie Palmieri, Ralph Peterson, Jr, Christian Scott, Gary Burton, and others. He is one of the owners and co-founders of independent jazz label Truth Revolution Records.

Biography
Luques was born in Hartford, Connecticut and raised in the neighboring town of Windsor. He began playing the bass at 12 years old and attended the Greater Hartford Academy of the Arts and the Artists Collective, Inc. founded by Jackie McLean and Paul (PB) Brown. After high school, he earned a full scholarship to the prestigious Berklee College of Music, where he studied with John Lockwood and Ron Mahdi. While in Boston, he was also able to work with great musicians such as Gary Burton, Ralph Peterson, Donald Harrison, Christian Scott, and Francisco Mela. Luques collaborated with his older brother Zaccai Curtis and formed a group called Insight. The group released their first album ‘A Genesis’ in 2006 and then also formed The Curtis Brothers and The Curtis Brothers Quartet. They have released multiple records with their groups on their record label Truth Revolution Records.

Discography

As co-leader

Insight 
 A Genesis (2006)

Curtis Brothers
 Blood, Spirit, Land, Water, Freedom (2009)
 Completion of Proof (2012)

As sideman

Eddie Palmieri
 Sabiduria/Wisdom (2017)
 Full Circle (2018)
 Mi Luz Mayor (2018)

Bill O'Connell
 Rhapsody In Blue (2010)
 Zocalo (2013)
 Imagine (2014)
 Latin Jazz All Stars (2016)

Dave Valentin
 Come Fly with Me (2006)

Sean Jones
 Roots (2006)
 Kaleidoscope (2007)
 The Search Within (2009)
 No Need For Words (2011)
 Im*pro*vise (2014)

Albert Rivera
 Re-Introduction (2008)
 Inner Peace (2010)

Miguel Zenon
 Identities Are Changeable (2014)

Scott Tixier
 Cosmic Adventure (2016)

Matt Garrison
 Familiar Places (2010)

Louis Fouché 
Subjective Mind (2012)

Orrin Evans
 Faith In Action (2010)
 Captain Black Big Band - Captain Black Big Band (2011)
 "...It was beauty" (2013)
 Captain Black Big Band - Mother's Touch (2014)
 Liberation Blues (2014)

Carlos Martin
 The Journey (2013)

Kervin Barreto
 First Impulse (2010)

Ali Bello
 Caracas - New York (2013)

Mitch Frohman
 From Daddy with Love (2013)

Natalie Fernandez
 Nuestro Tango (2014)

Sonora Latina
 Con Clave Para Bailar (2012)

Takuji Yamada
 Lite Blue (2008)

Soren Moller
 Résumé (2012)

Nicole Zuraitis
 Spread The Word (2012)

Ed Fast
 Straight Shot (2007)

John Santos
 La Esperanza (2011)

Chris Dempsey
 Onward (2008)

Francisco Mela
 Tree Of Life (2011)

Donald Harrison
 The Survivor (2006)

Darryl Yokley
 The Void (2012)

Romain Collin
 The Calling (2013)
 Press Enter (2015)

Jimmy Greene
 The Overcomer's Suite (2008)

Ralph Peterson
 The Duality Perspective (2012)

Shimrit Shoshan
 Keep It Movin' (2010)

Nils Weinhold
 Shapes (2011)

Gary Burton
 Next Generation (2005)

Christian Scott
 Rewind That (2006)
 Anthem (2007)
 Ruler Rebel (2017)
 The Emancipation Procrastination (2017)

Brian Lynch
 Simpactico (2006)
 Con Clave Vol. 2 (2010)

Dana Lauren
 It's You Or No One (2010)

Kris Allen
 Circle House (2011)

Andrei Matorin
 Opus (2009)

Samuel Bonnet
 Diasporapsodie (2014)

Brian Hogans
 Evidence Of Things To Come (2010)

David Weiss
 Venture Inward (2013)

Laine Cooke
 The Music Is The Magic (2014)

Eva Cortés
 In Bloom (2015)

Joanna Pascale
 Wildflower (2015)

Gian-Carla Tisera
 Nora La Bella (2014)

Lisa Hilton
 life is beautiful (2022)

Compilations
 Together (2012)

References

External links
 
 
 Label website

1983 births
Living people
Latin jazz musicians
American people of Puerto Rican descent
American bandleaders
American double-bassists
Male double-bassists
Musicians from New York City
21st-century double-bassists
21st-century American male musicians
American male jazz musicians